The Economic Statistics Centre of Excellence is an economics research institute in central London, established by the ONS.

History
ESCoE was founded by a consortium of British university business schools, including Strathclyde Business School, with the ONS in 2017.

Structure
It is housed at the National Institute of Economic and Social Research in central London.

Its purpose is to produce added inference from the UK economic data collated by the ONS.

See also
 Economic history of the United Kingdom
 UK Data Archive at the University of Essex

References

External links
 ESCoE

2017 establishments in the United Kingdom
Business education in the United Kingdom
College and university associations and consortia in the United Kingdom
Economic data
Economic history of the United Kingdom
Economic research institutes
Office for National Statistics
Organisations based in the City of Westminster
Research institutes established in 2017